Hasan Hüsnü Erdem (8 July 1889 – 22 August 1974) was a Turkish scholar, teacher, and Mufti who served as the sixth president of the Turkish Directorate of Religious Affairs from 1961 to 1964.

Biography
In his early life, Erdem learned Arabic from his father, before completing an education in Fiqh. He received a PhD on this topic in 1916 and subsequently taught at many schools and became an Islamic scholar. He retired in 1964.

Works 
He also contributed to more than two hundred biographies in Turkish Encyclopedia of Islam. His writings include:
Ebedî Risâlet - a translation of Abdul Rahman Azzam's Eternal Message
 Riyâzü’s-sâlihîn ve Tercemesi - on Al-Nawawi's The Meadows of the Righteous
 İlâhî Hadisler - on translation of hadiths
Berat Gecesi Hakkında Bir Tedkik

References 

Turkish scholars of Islam
Turkish muftis
1889 births
1974 deaths